Georgi Vladimirov (born 15 June 1976) is a former Bulgarian footballer who played as a forward and now manager.

Azerbaijan career statistics

References

Bulgarian footballers
1976 births
Living people
Association football forwards
FC Montana players
PFC Litex Lovech players
Botev Plovdiv players
PFC Slavia Sofia players
PFC Cherno More Varna players
First Professional Football League (Bulgaria) players
Bulgaria international footballers
Bulgarian expatriate sportspeople in Azerbaijan